The TreadPort Active Wind Tunnel (also known as the TPAWT) is a unique immersive virtual environment that integrates locomotion interfaces with sensory cues such as visual, auditory, olfactory, radiant heat and wind display. The TPAWT augments the Sarcos Treadport consisting of the Cave automatic virtual environment(CAVE) with a subsonic wind tunnel built around the user environment, and adds wind to the virtual environment. The Treadport Active Wind Tunnel is one of the first virtual environments to include wind into the sensory experience of the user. Other systems considering wind display, directly use fans.

Footnotes

External links
 The TPAWT at the University of Utah

References

Kulkarni, S.D.; Minor, M.A.; Deaver, M.W.; Pardyjak, E.R.; Hollerbach, J.M.Design, Sensing, and Control of a Scaled Wind Tunnel for Atmospheric Display, Mechatronics, IEEE/ASME Transactions on, vol.17, no.4, pp. 635–645, Aug. 2012
Kulkarni, S.D.; Chakravarthy,S.,Minor, M.A.;Pardyjak, E.R.; Hollerbach, J.M. Control of a Duct Flow Network for Wind Display in a Virtual Environment, Mechatronics, IEEE/ASME Transactions on, vol.17, no.6, pp. 1021–1030, 2012
Kirkman, R., and Metzger, M., "Conceptual design of an adaptive wind tunnel for the generation of unsteady complex flow patterns," ASME 2005 Fluids Engineering Division Summer Meeting and Exhibition, Houston, June 19–23, 2005.
Kirkman, R., Metzger, M., Deaver, M., and Pardyjak, E., "Sensitivity analysis of a three-dimensional wind tunnel design," ASME 2006 Fluids Engineering Division Summer Meeting and Exhibition, Miami, FL, July 17–20, 2006.
Kirkman, R., and Metzger, M., "Computational sensitivity analysis of laminar flows using finite volume methods," 60th Annual Meeting of the Division of Fluid Dynamics, American Physical Society, Nov. 18-20, 2007, Salt Lake City.
Kirkman, R., and Metzger, M., "Direct numerical simulation of sensitivity coefficients in low-Reynolds number turbulent channel flow," 5th AIAA Theoretical Fluid Mechanics Conference, American Institute of Aeronautics and Astronautics, 2008.
Kulkarni, S., Fisher, C., Pardyjak, E., Minor, M., and Hollerbach, J.M., ``Wind display device for locomotion interface in a virtual environment, Proc. World Haptics Conference, Salt Lake City, UT, March 18–20, 2009, pp. 184-189. doi: 10.1109/WHC.2009.4810855
Kulkarni, S.D., Minor, M.A., Deaver, M.W., and Pardyjak, E.R., "Output feedback control of wind display in a virtual environment," Proc. IEEE Intl. Conf. Robotics and Automation, Rome, Italy, April 10–14, 2007.
Kulkarni, S., Minor, M., Deaver, M., Pardyjak, E., and Hollerbach, J.M., ``Steady headwind display with conditional angular rate-switching control, Proc. IEEE Intl. Conf. Robotics and Automation, May 19–23, 2008, Pasadena, CA.
Kulkarni, S., Minor, M., Pardyjak, E., and Hollerbach, J.M., ``Combined wind speed and angle control in a virtual environment,'' Proc. IEEE/RSJ Intl. Conf. Intelligent Robots and Systems (IROS), Sept. 22-26, 2008, Nice, France.
Pardyjak, E.R., Singh, B., Norgren, A., and Willemsen, P., "Using video gaming technology to achieve low-cost speed up of emergency response urban dispersion simulations," 7th Symp. on the Urban Environment, American Meteorological Society, Sept. 10-13, 2007, San Diego.
Wang, H., Kearney, J.E., Cremer, J., and Willemsen, P., "Steering behaviors for autonomous vehicles in virtual environments," Proc. IEEE Virtual Reality, 2005.
Willemsen, P., Kearney, J.K., and Wang, H., "Ribbon networks for modeling navigable paths of autonomous paths of autonomous agents in virtual environments," IEEE Trans. Visualization and Computer Graphics, 12, 2006, p. 331.
Willemsen, P., Norgren, A., Singh, B., and Pardyjak, E.R., "Development of a new methodology for improving urban fast response Lagrangian dispersion simulation via parallelism on the graphics processing unit," Proc. 11th Intl. Conf. on Harmonisation within Atmospheric Dispersion Modelling for Regulatory Purposes, Queen's College, University of Cambridge, U.K., July 2–5, 2007.
Willemsen, P., Norgren, A., Singh, B., and Pardyjak, E.R., "Integrating particle dispersion models into real-time virtual environments," Proc. 14th Eurographics Symp. on Virtual Environments, 2008, p. 57.

Virtual reality